Anne Weber (born 13 November 1964) is a German-French author, translator and self-translator. Since 1983 Anne Weber has lived in Paris. She studied in Paris and worked for several editors.
Anne Weber started writing and publishing in French, but immediately translated her first book Ida invente la poudre into German Ida erfindet das Schießpulver. Since then she writes each of her books in French and German. Her self-translations are often published at the same time in France and Germany. In 2005 she received the 3Sat award at the Festival of German-Language Literature. For her translation of Pierre Michon she received a European translation award, the Europäischer Übersetzerpreis Offenburg. She was awarded the 2020 German Book Prize.

Works in French

Works in German

Translations into French
 Jacob Burckhardt: Démétrios, le preneur de villes. Paris 1992.
 Eleonore Frey: État d'urgence. Paris 1992.
 Wolfgang Schivelbusch: La nuit désenchantée. Paris 1993.
 Hans Mayer: Walter Benjamin. Paris 1995.
 Birgit Vanderbeke: Guerre froide. Paris 1997.
 Birgit Vanderbeke: Alberta reçoit un amant. Paris 1999.
 Jakob Arjouni: Un ami. Paris 2000.
 Corinne Hofmann: La Massaï blanche. Paris 2000.
 Melissa Müller: La vie d'Anne Frank. Paris 2000.
 Sibylle Lewitscharoff: Pong. Paris 2000.
 Birgit Vanderbeke: Devine ce que je vois. Paris 2000.
 Elke Schmitter: Madame Sartoris. Arles 2001.
 Lea Singer: Le maître du goût. Paris 2001.
 Wilhelm Genazino: Un parapluie pour ce jour-là. Paris 2002.
 Norbert Lebert: Car tu portes mon nom. Paris 2002.
 Sibylle Lewitscharoff:  Harald le courtois. Paris 2002.
 Erich Maria Remarque: Dis-moi que tu m'aimes. Paris 2002.
 Wilhelm Genazino: Un appartement, une femme, un roman. Paris 2004.

Translations into German
 Pierre Michon: Leben der kleinen Toten. Suhrkamp, 2003.
 Marguerite Duras: Hefte aus Kriegszeiten. Suhrkamp, 2007.
 Pierre Michon: Rimbaud der Sohn. Suhrkamp, 2008.

References

External links

 Interview mit Anne Weber von Schau ins Blau (in German)
 WorldCat
 Goethe (in German)

1964 births
Living people
German women writers
20th-century French non-fiction writers
20th-century French women writers
German writers in French
French writers in German
21st-century French non-fiction writers
21st-century German writers
21st-century French women writers
21st-century German women